This is a list of the 32 council areas of Scotland by their highest point.

Footnotes
 "Dundee Law’s summit is the highest point in the city"
 Map of Dundee council area and it´s boundaries

See also
List of counties of Scotland 1890–1975

References

Council areas by highest point
 Highest points
Council areas
Scottish council areas